Jonathan Scott Smith (born May 9, 1961) is an American rower who competed in the 1984, 1988 and 1992 Summer Olympics. He was born in Salem, Massachusetts, and attended Phillips Exeter Academy.

References

1961 births
Living people
American male rowers
Rowers at the 1984 Summer Olympics
Rowers at the 1988 Summer Olympics
Rowers at the 1992 Summer Olympics
Olympic silver medalists for the United States in rowing
Olympic bronze medalists for the United States in rowing
Medalists at the 1988 Summer Olympics
Medalists at the 1984 Summer Olympics
Pan American Games medalists in rowing
Pan American Games gold medalists for the United States
World Rowing Championships medalists for the United States
Rowers at the 1983 Pan American Games
Phillips Exeter Academy alumni